Meterana vitiosa is a moth of the family Noctuidae. It was described by Arthur Gardiner Butler in 1877 from specimens collected by Dr Hector and Mr J. D. Enys in the South Island. It is endemic to New Zealand. The habitat this species prefers consists of forests and shrub-land areas. Adults are on the wing throughout the year.

References

External links

 Meterana vitiosa in species id
 Citizen science observations

Moths described in 1887
Moths of New Zealand
Hadeninae
Endemic fauna of New Zealand
Endemic moths of New Zealand